Redbird is an album of contemporary classical music by American composer and saxophonist/multi-instrumentalist John Zorn consisting of two tribute compositions for artist Agnes Martin.

Reception
The Allmusic review by Satcia Proefrock awarded the album 4 stars stating "Redbird captures that sense in music and, in its continuity, becomes one of Zorn's most effective tributes. As always, Zorn has managed to collect a group of extremely talented musicians, and their execution of this album makes it even more perfect".

Track listing
All compositions by John Zorn
 "Dark River" - 8:51 
 "Redbird" - 41:01

Personnel
Jim Pugliese – bass drums, percussion
Carol Emanuel – harp (track 2) 
Erik Friedlander – cello (track 2) 
Jill Jaffe – viola (track 2) 
John Zorn – conductor

References

1995 albums
Albums produced by John Zorn
John Zorn albums
Tzadik Records albums